Ellen Anne Hewett (née Baker, 15 July 1843 – 14 February 1926) was a New Zealand writer. She was born in Jersey, Channel Islands, on 15 July 1843.

References

1843 births
1926 deaths
Jersey writers
Jersey emigrants to New Zealand
19th-century New Zealand writers
19th-century New Zealand women writers